Sime Kovacevic (born 21 July 1987 in Australia) is a footballer who plays for Altona Magic in  Victoria's Division 1

Kovacevic played for New Zealand Knights during the 2006–07 A-League.

References

1987 births
Living people
Australian soccer players
Australian expatriate soccer players
Australian people of Croatian descent
A-League Men players
St Albans Saints SC players
GNK Dinamo Zagreb players
Caroline Springs George Cross FC players
New Zealand Knights FC players
North Geelong Warriors FC players
Hume City FC players
Moreland Zebras FC players
Altona Magic SC players
Expatriate association footballers in New Zealand

Association football defenders